Sheridan Lake is a lake in Hubbard County, in the U.S. state of Minnesota.

Sheridan Lake was named for Philip Sheridan, a Union officer in the Civil War.

See also
List of lakes in Minnesota

References

Lakes of Minnesota
Lakes of Hubbard County, Minnesota